Robert Emmett Lynch (July 31, 1882 – May 1, 1959) was an American baseball player and coach, and member of the Wisconsin State Assembly.

Born in Chicago, Lynch played for the Notre Dame Fighting Irish from 1900 to 1902, and then in minor league baseball until 1914.  He played in the American Association, Western League, Southern Association, Eastern League, Central League, and the Wisconsin–Illinois League.  Lynch also coached college baseball at Notre Dame (where he was head coach in 1903), Northwestern, and Clemson (head coach in 1908), and coached in the minors.

Career
After his baseball career, Lynch was a member of the Wisconsin State Assembly twice. First, from 1933 to 1936 and second, from 1943 to 1958. He was a Democrat. He died at Green Bay, Wisconsin after a short illness in 1959.

References

1880s births
1959 deaths
Baseball players from Chicago
Clemson Tigers baseball coaches
Democratic Party members of the Wisconsin State Assembly
Northwestern Wildcats baseball coaches
Notre Dame Fighting Irish baseball coaches
Notre Dame Fighting Irish baseball players
Politicians from Chicago
Sportspeople from Chicago
20th-century American politicians
Baseball coaches from Illinois